The 1991 Kansas City Royals season involved the Royals finishing 6th in the American League West with a record of 82 wins and 80 losses.

Offseason

 October 4, 1990: Chris Codiroli was released by the Royals.
 November 21, 1990: Mike Boddicker was signed as a free agent by the Royals.
 December 1, 1990: Kirk Gibson was signed as a free agent by the Royals.
 December 4, 1990: Dan Schatzeder was signed as a free agent by the Royals.
 March 18, 1991: Bo Jackson was released by the Royals.

Regular season

Season standings

Record vs. opponents

Notable transactions
 April 5, 1991: Warren Cromartie was signed as a free agent by the Royals.
 May 29, 1991: Dan Schatzeder was released by the Royals.
 June 3, 1991: 1991 Major League Baseball draft
Rod Myers was drafted by the Royals in the 13th round.
Les Norman was drafted by the Royals in the 25th round. Player signed June 12, 1991.

Roster

Player stats

Batting

Starters by position
Note: Pos = Position; G = Games played; AB = At bats; H = Hits; Avg. = Batting average; HR = Home runs; RBI = Runs batted in

Other batters
Note: G = Games played; AB = At bats; H = Hits; Avg. = Batting average; HR = Home runs; RBI = Runs batted in

Pitching

Starting pitchers
Note: G = Games pitched; IP = Innings pitched; W = Wins; L = Losses; ERA = Earned run average; SO = Strikeouts

Other pitchers
Note: G = Games pitched; IP = Innings pitched; W = Wins; L = Losses; ERA = Earned run average; SO = Strikeouts

Relief pitchers
Note: G = Games pitched; W = Wins; L = Losses; SV = Saves; ERA = Earned run average; SO = Strikeouts

Farm system

References

External links
1991 Kansas City Royals at Baseball Reference
1991 Kansas City Royals at Baseball Almanac

Kansas City Royals seasons
Kansas City Royals season
Kansas City Royals